The Women's U23 Pan-American Volleyball Cup is a bi-annual Continental Cup organized by NORCECA for U23 teams from all over America (North-, South- and Central America, and the Caribbean)

Results

Medal table

Teams by year

MVP by edition
2012 –  Yonkaira Peña
2014 –  Brayelin Martínez
2016 –  Brayelin Martínez
2018 –  Gaila González
2021 –  Madeline Guillén

See also
 Women's Pan-American Volleyball Cup
 Women's Junior Pan-American Volleyball Cup
 Girls' Youth Pan-American Volleyball Cup

External links
 NORCECA

Pan-American Volleyball Cup
Women's Pan-American Volleyball Cup
Recurring sporting events established in 2012
2012 establishments in North America
2012 establishments in South America